The seventh election to Pembrokeshire County Council was held in March 1907.  It was preceded by the 1904 election and followed by the 1910 election.

Overview of the result
While there were a number of keenly contested wards a large number of wards were uncontested. The Conservatives took control of the Council in a result described by the Pembrokeshire Herald as a defeat for the "radical caucus". Even so, the Liberals polled strongly in norther parts of the county.

Boundary changes
There were no boundary changes at this election.

Results

Ambleston

Amroth

Begelly

Burton

Camrose

Carew

Castlemartin

Cilgerran

Clydey

Eglwyswrw

Fishguard

Haverfordwest, Prendergast and Uzmaston

Haverfordwest St Martin's and St Mary's

Haverfordwest, St Thomas and Furzy Park

Haverfordwest St Martin's Hamlets

Henry's Mote

Lampeter Velfrey

Llanfyrnach

Llangwm

Llanstadwell

Llanwnda

Llawhaden

Maenclochog

Manorbier

Mathry

Milford

Monkton

Narberth North

Nevern

Newport

Pembroke Ward 30

Pembroke Ward 31

Pembroke Dock Ward 32

Pembroke Dock Ward 33

Pembroke Dock Ward 34

Pembroke Dock Ward 35

Pembroke Dock Ward 36

St David's

St Dogmaels

St Ishmaels

St Issels

Slebech and Martletwy

Steynton

Tenby Ward 44

Tenby Ward 45

Walwyn's Castle

Whitchurch

Wiston

Election of aldermen
Aldermen were elected at the first meeting of the new council.

References

1907
1907 Welsh local elections